Still Walking, or Od ani holeh, is a book by Yaky Yosha, and a film based on the book. 

Still Walking may also refer to:

 Still Walking (film), a 2008 Japanese film
 Still Walking, 2011 album by Graeme Connors
 "Still Walking", track on 1979 album 20 Jazz Funk Greats by Throbbing Gristle